Steven Eisman (born July 8, 1962) is an American businessman and investor known for having shorted collateralized debt obligations (CDOs), thereby profiting from the collapse of the US housing bubble in 2007–2008.

Early life, education, and family
Eisman grew up in New York City, where he attended Yeshiva schools. He attended the University of Pennsylvania, graduating magna cum laude in 1984. He then graduated from Harvard Law School with honors. His parents worked in finance; they were brokers for Oppenheimer. Eisman was unhappy with his work in law. His parents arranged a position for him at Oppenheimer working as an equity analyst. Oppenheimer's anti-nepotism rules required his parents to pay the first year of his salary.

FrontPoint Partners
Eisman rose to fame betting against collateralized debt obligations at Greenwich, Connecticut-based FrontPoint Partners LLC, a unit of Morgan Stanley. By 2010, he managed more than $1 billion for FrontPoint, and gained prominence after being profiled by Michael Lewis in his book The Big Short: Inside the Doomsday Machine. In the movie adaptation of Lewis' book, The Big Short, Eisman's name was changed to Mark Baum, and was portrayed by actor Steve Carell. He left FrontPoint Partners in 2011 amid investor withdrawals following an investigation of illegal insider trading by portfolio manager Chip Skowron.

Emrys Partners
In 2012, Eisman founded Emrys Partners with $23 million in seed capital. The fund performed poorly in 2012, returning 3.6% and underperforming the market. It did better in 2013, returning 10.8% but still underperforming the market. In July 2014, he announced that he was shutting down the fund, explaining his decision by stating that "making investment decisions by looking solely at the fundamentals of individual companies is no longer a viable investment philosophy." The fund controlled an estimated $185 million in assets at the time of its dissolution. Emrys Partners stopped operating in mid-2014.

Neuberger Berman
In September 2014, Eisman joined Neuberger Berman as a managing director and a portfolio manager for the Eisman Group within Neuberger Berman’s Private Asset Management division. The group, run by partners including Steve's parents, Elliott and Lillian Eisman, manages portfolios of stocks for wealthy clients.

Campaign against for-profit colleges
During a presentation at the 2010 Ira Sohn Conference Investment Research Conference, Eisman raised concerns about the for-profit education industry. In his presentation, Eisman was highly critical of companies that run for-profit colleges, such as Apollo Education Group, Corinthian Colleges, Education Management Corporation, and ITT Educational Services, likening their loaning practices to what he witnessed from the subprime mortgage industry in the midst of the housing bubble.

 "Until recently, I thought that there would never again be an opportunity to be involved with an industry as socially destructive and morally bankrupt as the subprime mortgage industry. I was wrong. The for-profit education industry has proven equal to the task."

After the Department of Education took action to strengthen a variety of consumer protection regulations in 2009-10, the for-profit industry retaliated by accusing Eisman of attempting to illegally influence the government and calling for an investigation. The allegations stem from a meeting that Eisman had with Department of Education officials David Bergeron and Robert Shireman, two weeks before delivering his speech at the Ira Sohn Conference. Shireman was in charge of the department's regulatory efforts, which had begun more than a year earlier. The agency’s Inspector General, after a review, concluded there was “no improper disclosure of sensitive information by Department officials in their communications with outside parties.”

After offering testimony to Senate Health, Education and Labor Committee on problems with for-profit higher education, Eisman was criticized by progressive groups such as Citizens for Responsibility and Ethics in Washington (CREW) on the grounds that he stood to profit from proposed regulations due to his short positions against private colleges. CREW was later found to have been receiving payments from a founder of for-profit University of Phoenix. Harris Miller, president of the lobbying group that represents for-profit colleges said of him, "Eisman is a self-serving nutcase who got lucky. He's in the business of ruining the reputation of companies so he can make money when their stock prices drop."

By the end of 2018, after government and media investigations had exposed predatory practices including fraudulent inducement to enroll, both Corinthian and Educational services were defunct, having ceased operations, due to reduced enrollment and ineligibility to continue participating  in government backed student loan programs. The U.S. Department of Education later forgave over a half-million student loans linked to Corinthian programs.

Personal life
He has been married to Valerie Feigen since 1989. Valerie was also portrayed in The Big Short under the name Cynthia, by Marisa Tomei. Feigen, who worked for J.P. Morgan, said of her husband, "Even on Wall Street people think he's rude and obnoxious and aggressive." While Eisman seems aware of his tendency to be rude he does not seem to be concerned by it. He once said to an interviewer on this topic, "I forget myself sometimes."

Eisman's first-born son, Max, died after his night nurse rolled on top of him in her sleep. Eisman and his intimates describe the death of his son as a hugely influential event that affected him in many ways.

References 

1962 births
Living people
American money managers
American venture capitalists
Businesspeople from New York City
Harvard Law School alumni
New York (state) lawyers
University of Pennsylvania alumni
20th-century American Jews
21st-century American Jews